Ethamukkala is a village in Kothapatnam mandal, located in Prakasam district of Andhra Pradesh  from District headquarter Ongole.

The village has an ancient temple Sree Jwala Mukhi Amma temple for their village Goddess.

Shiva Rathri is the big festival celebrated by the people of this village along with a nearby village Madanuru, both the village people celebrate the Ratha Yathra for Lord Siva during this festival with devotional unity irrespective of their caste and religion.

The village has SUVR & SR Govt Polytechnic for women
 India.

References

Villages in Prakasam district